Tombali is a town located in the Tombali Region of Guinea-Bissau.

Populated places in Guinea-Bissau